Senna pendula, also known as Easter Cassia, Christmas Senna, winter Senna, climbing Cassia, golden shower, pendant Senna and valamuerto, is a plant of the Fabaceae family with a shrub habit that is native to South America. It used in various parts of the world as an ornamental plant and is an environmental weed in Australia. The flowers are yellow and the name pendula means 'pendulous' or 'drooping'.

Description

It is a fast-growing, spreading, scrambling or erect shrub that reaches 2–4 metres in height with multi-branched and arching stems and branches. Its single-compound, hairless leaves feature three to six duos of wide leaflets that are 1–5 cm long and 5–20 mm wide with rounded tips and salient yellowish margins.

Its bright yellow flowers, which are about 3 cm across, have five large petals and are foaled in leafy clumps at the tips of the branches. The fruit is in a cylindrical pod (10–20 cm long and 6–12 mm wide) that hangs down. It flowers prominently at Easter in the southern hemisphere (or early autumn), hence its common name. It also has an insignificant flowering season in early summer (around Christmas in the southern hemisphere).

Senna pendula is distinguished from Senna bicapsularis which has 3 pairs of leaflets on each leaf, while this one has 4-7 pairs of leaflets on each leaf and a gland between each pair of leaflets. 'S. bicapsularis' has flowers borne on rather short pedicels (flower stalks) that are less than half a centimeter in length, whereas 'S. pendula' has flowers borne on longer (1 to 3 cm) pedicels. 'S. pendula' may flower from as early as late summer, whereas S. bicapsularis blooms from late autumn to winter.

Invasive species
The S. p. glabrata variety has become naturalised, and is also an environmental weed, in eastern Australia in the coastal and sub-coastal regions of south-eastern Queensland and New South Wales, where it is found in watercourses, gardens, disturbed sites, wastelands, roadsides, closed forests, forest margins and urban bushland.

It is spread by seed, suckers and dumped garden waste. Despite it being invasive, it is not a prohibited or restricted invasive plant under the Biosecurity Act 2015.

Cultivation
Senna pendula was introduced as a garden plant in Australia in 1957, where it was described in a Brisbane nursery catalogue as, "a useful shrub bearing masses of buttercup-shaped flowers in autumn and early winter". Much sought for, gardeners had paid four shillings to purchase this plant during the mid 20th century. The shrub was in the market for many decades, though now it is no longer sold due its invasive nature.

In Florida, Senna pendula is usually cultivated as, and misapplied to, Senna bicapsularis. An investigation of herbarium specimens from the University of Florida, University of South Florida, and Fairchild Tropical Botanic Garden had suggested that true Senna bicapsularis is very scarce in cultivation in Florida, whereas Senna pendula is more common and widespread.

Subspecies

The plant features the following subspecies:

S. p. advena
S. p. ambigua
S. p. dolichandra
S. p. eriocarpa
S. p. glabrata
S. p. hemirostrata
S. p. indistincta
S. p. meticola
S. p. mission
S. p. ovalifolia
S. p. paludicola
S. p. pendula
S. p. praeandina
S. p. recondita
S. p. scandens
S. p. stahlii
S. p. tenuifolia

Gallery

Notes

References

bicapsularis
Plants described in 1982
Flora of Brazil
Flora of Venezuela
Flora of Colombia
Flora of Bolivia
Flora of Paraguay
Flora of Argentina
Flora naturalised in Australia
Ornamental plants
IUCN Red List least concern species
Invasive plant species in Australia